Mohammad Moradi (1984 – 26 December 2022) was an Iranian student living in the city of Lyon, France, who threw himself into the  Rhône River in protest against the widespread suppression of the 2022 uprising in Iran and with the aim of drawing global attention to the violent behavior of the Islamic Republic towards protesters.

Personal life
Moradi had been married to his wife for three years; they both lived in Lyon, France.

Motivations
Before throwing himself into the Rhone river, Mohammad Moradi published two videos of himself in Persian and French. In his Persian language video, he emphasized that his purpose of committing suicide was not due to personal problems and he wanted to draw the attention of Europeans and Western people to the issue of Iran. He also added that he cannot tolerate the current miserable life both inside and outside of Iran.

See also
 Mahsa Amini protests

References

1984 births
2022 deaths
Iranian expatriates in France
Iranian Kurdish people
Suicides by drowning in France
People from Kermanshah